Brugmann is a German surname. Notable people with the surname include:

 Bruce B. Brugmann, editor and publisher of the San Francisco Bay Guardian
 Karl Brugmann (1849–1919), German linguist
 Brugmann's law
 Walter Brugmann (1887–1944), German architect

See also 
 Brugmann Mountains
 Houba-Brugmann metro station, one of the metro stations on line 6 of the Brussels Metro
 Brugman, a surname
 Brugmans, a Dutch surname
 Bruckmann, a German surname

German-language surnames